Vittoria Bianco (born 7 October 1995) is an Italian Paralympic swimmer.

She competed at the 2020 Summer Paralympics, participating in the women's 100m freestyle S9, and the women's 400m freestyle S9.

See also
Italy at the 2020 Summer Paralympics

References

External links
 

1995 births
Living people
People from Putignano
Paralympic swimmers of Italy
Swimmers at the 2020 Summer Paralympics
Italian female freestyle swimmers
Italian disabled sportspeople
Paralympic gold medalists for Italy
Sportspeople from the Metropolitan City of Bari
S9-classified Paralympic swimmers
Medalists at the World Para Swimming European Championships